Natashquan is the name of two communities in the Canadian province of Quebec, which are closely related but distinct:

Natashquan (reserve), an Innu reserve
Natashquan (township)
Natashquan Airport, located adjacent to Natashquan
Natashquan River